Augustine Silvia Ejangue Siliki (born 19 January 1989) is a Cameroonian footballer, who plays as a defender for Turkish Super League club Fatih Karagümrük and the Cameroon women's national team.

Club career
She played for Energiya Voronezh and WFC Rossiyanka of the Russian Top League, Arna-Bjørnar of the Norwegian Toppserien and also Danish Elitedivisionen club Fortuna Hjørring.

A Russian-speaking agent secured Ejangue and compatriot Ajara Nchout a lucrative transfer to Energiya Voronezh in 2011. But her time in Russia was interrupted by illness when she contracted malaria while back in Cameroon on national team duty.

Ejangue had signed for Swedish club Tyresö FF when they suffered a financial implosion and withdrew from the 2014 Damallsvenskan season, expunging all their results and making all their players free agents. She moved on to finish the season with Amazon Grimstad of the Norwegian Toppserien. In February 2015 Ejangue agreed a two-year contract with another Scandinavian club, Fortuna Hjørring. In summer 2017 she moved to Spain and signed for Santa Teresa CD.

In November 2020, Ejangue debuted for FC Ebolowa in the Cameroonian Women's Championship. In August 2021 she returned to Europe, signing a one-year contract with newly-promoted Italian Serie A club Pomigliano.

End October 2022, she moved to Turkey, and signed with the Istanbul-based club  Fatih Karagümrük to play in the Women's Super League.

International career 
She is a member of the Cameroonian national team, who she represented at the 2012 Summer Olympics and the 2015 and 2019 editions of the FIFA Women's World Cup.

At the 2019 FIFA Women's World Cup, Cameroon faced England in the last sixteen stage. Ejangue's back-pass to her goalkeeper conceded the indirect free kick from which England took the lead. She spat on Toni Duggan in the immediate aftermath, one of several controversies during Cameroon's 0–3 defeat.

References

External links 
 
 
 

1989 births
Living people
Footballers from Douala
Cameroonian women's footballers
Women's association football defenders
FC Energy Voronezh players
WFC Rossiyanka players
Tyresö FF players
Amazon Grimstad players
Fortuna Hjørring players
Santa Teresa CD players
Damallsvenskan players
Primera División (women) players
Cameroon women's international footballers
Olympic footballers of Cameroon
Footballers at the 2012 Summer Olympics
2015 FIFA Women's World Cup players
2019 FIFA Women's World Cup players
Cameroonian expatriate women's footballers
Cameroonian expatriate sportspeople in Equatorial Guinea
Expatriate women's footballers in Equatorial Guinea
Cameroonian expatriate sportspeople in Russia
Expatriate women's footballers in Russia
Cameroonian expatriate sportspeople in Sweden
Expatriate women's footballers in Sweden
Cameroonian expatriate sportspeople in Norway
Expatriate women's footballers in Norway
Cameroonian expatriate sportspeople in Denmark
Expatriate women's footballers in Denmark
Cameroonian expatriate sportspeople in Spain
Expatriate women's footballers in Spain
Cameroonian expatriate sportspeople in Italy
Pomigliano C.F. players
Expatriate women's footballers in Italy
Serie A (women's football) players
Arna-Bjørnar players
Toppserien players
Expatriate women's footballers in Turkey
Cameroonian expatriate sportspeople in Turkey
Turkish Women's Football Super League players
Fatih Karagümrük S.K. (women's football) players